Ripollet is a municipality in the comarca of the Vallès Occidental in Catalonia, Spain. It is situated on the left bank of the Ripoll river. The town is served by the AP-7, C-58 and C-33 highways, the N-150 road and a RENFE railway line.

Demography

References

 Panareda Clopés, Josep Maria; Rios Calvet, Jaume; Rabella Vives, Josep Maria (1989). Guia de Catalunya, Barcelona: Caixa de Catalunya.  (Spanish).  (Catalan).

External links
 Government data pages 

Municipalities in Vallès Occidental
Populated places in Vallès Occidental